The Schweppervescence, registered as the T L Baillieu Handicap, is an Australian Turf Club Group 3 Thoroughbred quality handicap horse race, for two-year-olds, over a distance of 1400 metres, held annually at Rosehill Racecourse in Sydney, Australia. Total prize money for the race is A$160,000.

History
The registered race is named in honour of the former Australian Jockey Club Chairman Tom Latham Baillieu (elected in 1947). The race was initially part of the AJC Autumn Carnival and raced at Randwick and later at Warwick Farm.

Name
1986–2002 - T L Baillieu Handicap
2003–2005 - T L Baillieu Quality Handicap
2006–2009 - T L Baillieu Handicap
2010 onwards - The Schweppervescence

Grade
1986–2010 - Listed Race
2011 onwards - Group 3

Venue
1986–1998 - Randwick Racecourse
1999–2000 - Warwick Farm Racecourse 
2001 - Randwick Kensington (inner all weather track)
2002–2007 - Warwick Farm Racecourse
2008–2009 - Randwick Racecourse Kensington (inner all weather track) 
2010 onwards - Rosehill Racecourse

Winners

 2022 - Williamsburg
 2021 - Saif
2020 - Holyfield
2019 - Bellevue Hill
2018 - Irukandji
2017 - The Mission
2016 - Attention
2015 - Takedown
2014 - Bachman
2013 - Champollion
2012 - Flying Snitzel
2011 - Do You Think
2010 - Skilled
2009 - Onemorenomore 
2008 - Rhyno Chaser
2007 - Pistols  
2006 - Mentality
2005 - Paratroopers
2004 - Gaze On
2003 - Winning Belle
2002 - Redwood Falls
2001 - Vita
2000 - Clonmel
1999 - Citirecruit
1998 - Danske
1997 - Key Issue
1996 - Bolster
1995 - Latin Quarter
1994 - Talaga
1993 - Santiago Belle
1992 - Quegent
1991 - French Prince
1990 - Shot Of Comfort
1989 - Select Prince
1988 - Bayonette
1987 - All Ashore
1986 - Western Ace

See also
 List of Australian Group races
 Group races

External links 
First three place getters The Schweppervescence (ATC)

References

Horse races in Australia